Rusted Root is an American worldbeat rock band formed in 1990 in Pittsburgh, Pennsylvania by singer-guitarist Michael Glabicki (born January 21, 1971), bassist Patrick Norman and percussionist Liz Berlin. The band got its start as the house band playing a weekly gig in Jack's Back Room on Pittsburgh's South Side. The band achieved fame in 1994 with its platinum-selling album When I Woke, which included the hit single "Send Me on My Way". The song has been featured prominently in many films and commercials. Rusted Root has sold more than three million albums, and is currently on hiatus. After releasing The Movement in 2012 and touring through 2015, the band went on an indefinite hiatus, with principal songwriter and vocalist Michael Glabicki forming the group Uprooted with former members of Rusted Root and continuing to tour with that group into the early 2020s.

Musical style and influences
The band is known for its fusion of acoustic, rock, world and other styles of music, with a strong percussion section that draws from African, Latin American, Indian and Native American influences. Michael Glabicki has acknowledged the popular success of Peter Gabriel's 1986 album So as an influence on his decision to incorporate worldbeat into his own music. The band's lyrical content varies but often talks about Christianity and Judaism. The group's 2012 album, The Movement, was fan-funded.

Current members
Michael Glabicki – lead vocals, guitar, harmonica, mandolin (1990–present)
Patrick Norman – bass guitar, backing vocals, percussion
Liz Berlin – vocals, percussion

Past members
 Jim Donovan – drums, percussion (1990–2002)
 Jenn Wertz – backing vocals, percussion (1990–2008)

Discography

Studio albums

Live albums
Rusted Root Live (2004)

Compilations
The Best of Rusted Root: 20th Century Masters - The Millennium Collection (2005)

Extended plays
Rusted Root  (1990)
Christ Monkey  (1991)
Live (1995)
Evil Ways (1996)
Airplane (1998)

Singles

References

External links

 
 Official Facebook page
 Rusted Root collection at the Internet Archive's live music archive
 

Rock music groups from Pennsylvania
Worldbeat groups
Jam bands
Musical groups from Pittsburgh
Musical groups established in 1990
1990 establishments in Pennsylvania
Shanachie Records artists
Mercury Records artists